Dolichoderus rosenbergi is a species of ant in the genus Dolichoderus. Described by Forel in 1911, the species is endemic to Ecuador.

References

Dolichoderus
Hymenoptera of South America
Insects described in 1911